Aethes caucasica is a species of moth of the family Tortricidae. It was described by Hans Georg Amsel in 1959. It is found in Italy, Bulgaria, Romania, Russia, the Near East and Georgia.

Adults are on wing May to July.

References

caucasica
Moths described in 1959
Moths of Europe
Moths of Asia